Mary Sandeman (born 20 November 1947), better known by her stage name Aneka , is a retired Scottish singer.

In 1981, she reached number one in the UK Singles Chart with her song "Japanese Boy". She was well known for the Oriental image she took on for the song. After her brief foray into pop, she reverted to her real name and reestablished herself as an accomplished singer of traditional Scottish music.

Overview 
Mary Sandeman recorded the song "Japanese Boy" in 1981. Impressed with the results, her record company Hansa decided to release it as a single with full promotion. Having discovered the name Aneka in a telephone directory, Aneka devised a suitable image for her performances of the song. Released in summer 1981, "Japanese Boy" climbed the charts impressively and reached no. 1 for one week in August.

Buoyed by this success, the record company commissioned an album and looked to find a follow-up single. The song "Little Lady" was chosen, but caused some concern as to what image to use, as it was felt that a Japanese look would be inappropriate for the song as well as giving the artist a limited life-span. In the event Aneka adopted an 18th-century "lady" image, but retained the same high-pitched voice as used for her hit. The song failed to chart highly in the U.K., reaching only no. 50 – securing her the label of one-hit wonder.

Aneka first pop album, entitled Aneka, was released at the same time (although she had in 1979 released an album under her own name) and featured a mix of upbeat tracks in the vein of "Japanese Boy" and a selection of slow-paced numbers, sung in her "true" singing voice. The album however failed to chart.

A third single was released in early 1982. This was "Ooh Shooby Doo Doo Lang", which told a light-hearted tale of a singer bemoaning the fact that she has been relegated to backing vocals; the lyrics go on to mention Paul McCartney and Stevie Wonder and both "Japanese Boy" and "Little Lady". The song missed the UK chart; however in Europe it gave her a third hit and was followed there by the release of another album track, "I Was Free".

Two further singles were released over the next two years, "Heart to Beat" in 1983 and "Rose, Rose, I Love You" in 1984, but neither of them found success. Aneka then dropped the Aneka title and continued with the folk-singing career she had begun before her fame.

Aneka featured in a 2006 Channel 4 documentary titled 'Bring Back The One Hit Wonders'. Justin Lee Collins attempted to organise a one-off performance of as many one hit wonders as possible but despite getting in touch with Aneka, she declined to take part as she did not want to travel to London from her home in Scotland, and had no desire to perform the hit that made her place in pop history. She stated though that "Japanese Boy" sold five million copies around the world.

She has since confirmed her retirement from music, and was last known to be working as a part-time tour guide for the Scottish city of Stirling.

Mary Sandeman
Under her real name, Aneka released two albums; one in 1979 titled Introducing Mary Sandeman and another in 1991, Reflections on Scotland. These albums featured many traditional folk songs sung both in English and Scots language. 
Aneka had been a Gold Medal winner at The Mòd. After her commercial success ended, Aneka dropped the Aneka name and returned to her Scottish folk roots and continued to perform under her real name. A mezzo-soprano, she has appeared with the Scottish Fiddle Orchestra in concert and on record. In 1994 she made a documentary entitled Aite Mo Ghaoil: Mary Sandeman and Islay. She has also appeared on STV music shows such as Thingummyjig and Hogmanay celebrations.

Aneka is divorced from her husband, Angus, who was a doctor. They had two sons, Duncan and Iain. Her brother, David, was killed in a flying accident in 1975.

Discography

Studio albums

Singles

References

1947 births
Living people
British dance musicians
20th-century Scottish women singers
Scottish folk singers
Hansa Records artists
Musicians from Edinburgh